Petit-Goâve is a coastal commune in the Léogâne Arrondissement in the Ouest department of Haiti. The town has a population of approximately 12,000 inhabitants.

History

The town is one of the oldest cities of the country, and was named Goâve by the Amerindians. The Spanish called it Aguava at the end of the 16th century. After French colonization through the releasing of the Spanish, the French divided the city into two halves; Grand-Goâve and Petit-Goâve.  Petit-Goâve became a wealthy settlement and briefly functioned as a de facto capital of the prosperous colony of Saint-Domingue. It is also very famous for its sweet candy called douce macoss.

January 2010 earthquake
The town was significantly affected by the 12 January 2010 earthquake. On 20 January a strong aftershock of magnitude 5.9 Mw struck Haiti. The U.S. Geological Survey reported that its epicenter was almost exactly under Petit-Goâve. The magnitude of the aftershock was initially reported as 6.1 by the USGS, but was later revised to 5.9.

On the 19th, authorized by the Haitian government, 1300 US Marines were deployed equally between Petit-Goâve and Grand-Goâve. Spanish amphibious assault ship Castilla is to arrive at Petit-Goâve beginning in February to assist in recovery efforts.

Aid For Haiti (AFH), a US-based non-profit has been coordinating some of the local medical care in the area of Petit-Goâve. They are located at the Wesleyan Compound in Petit-Goâve.

The 400th episode of the radio program This American Life, which aired in February 2010, featured a story on a school in Petit-Goâve and estimated 1000 people died due to the earthquake.

Notables

 Dany Laferrière, Haitian-Canadian writer
 Faustin Elie Soulouque (Faustin I), President of Haiti (1847–1849), Emperor of Haiti (1849–1859)

Facilities
Petit-Goâve has a hospital, Notre-Dame de Petit-Goâve.
In February 2010, this hospital was largely unusable due to damage from the earthquake. The Norwegian Red Cross ERU (Emergency Response Unit) has established their field hospital in the hospital and runs 2 fully equipped Operation Theaters and 2 ambulances with paramedics. Norwegian Red Cross support the hospital with electrical power, medical equipment and medicine.

On February 15, 2013, the US State Department's Bureau of International Narcotics and Law Enforcement Affairs announced that it would be funding and building a 150-bed prison in Petit-Goâve to replace the one destroyed in 2004 after the ouster of President Jean-Bertrand Aristide

Pictures

References

External links
 Petit-Goâve 350 Development
 Reuters, "Petit-Goâve atlas of building damage assessment", 2 March 2010

Populated places in Ouest (department)
Communes of Haiti
Port cities in the Caribbean